The 2018 LPGA of Japan Tour was the 51st season of the LPGA of Japan Tour, the professional golf tour for women operated by the Ladies Professional Golfers' Association of Japan. The 2018 schedule included 38 official events.

Schedule
The number in parentheses after winners' names show the player's total number wins in official money individual events on the LPGA of Japan Tour, including that event. All tournaments were played in Japan.

Events in bold are majors.
The Toto Japan Classic was co-sanctioned with the LPGA Tour.

External links
 

2018
2018 in women's golf
2018 in Japanese sport